Sandyville may refer to:

 Sandyville, Iowa, United States
 Sandyville, Newfoundland and Labrador, Canada
 Sandyville, Ohio, United States
 Sandyville, West Virginia, United States